Adeline King Robinson (March 22, 1865 – December 18, 1943) was an American female tennis player who was active during the 1880s and 1890s.

She was born on Staten Island in New York, the daughter of stockbroker Beverly Robinson and Eliza Gracie King. She was educated at private schools in New York City and in France.

Robinson mainly played at the Staten Island Cricket and Baseball Club and in New York tournaments. In September 1887 she won the doubles event at the New York Lawn Tennis Club open tournament with Miss Clark. In October she won the singles title at the Hastings-on-Hudson tournament after defeating Ellen Roosevelt in the final.

Robinson competed in the women's singles event at the 1888 National Championships, played in June at the Philadelphia Cricket Club. She defeated Augusta Roberts in the first round in straight sets and won her second round match against Ellen Roosevelt before losing in the semifinal to eventual champion Bertha Townsend after failing to convert a matchpoint. She was described by tennis champion Henry Slocum in 1889 as "the most skillful exponent of lawn tennis to be found among the women of America."

After rheumatism cut short her tennis career Robinson took up golf and played for the Richmond County Country Club. She was the defending champion at the 1898 Harbor Hill Golf Club tournament and competed at the W.M.G.A. tournament in 1900.

In the late 1890s she began giving dancing lessons to children which she continued to do until about 1939.

Notes

References

1865 births
1943 deaths
American female tennis players
Tennis people from New York (state)